Brunet wieczorową porą is a 1976 Polish comedy film directed by Stanisław Bareja.

Synopsis
A Gypsy woman appears at the house of the protagonist, Michał Roman, and makes a number of strange prophecies, which he initially dismisses. The most serious prediction is that Michał will accidentally kill a brown-haired man at his house the next evening. Together with a friend, Michał tries to prevent the imminent crime. He leaves his house, but misfortune follows him, as all the Gypsy woman's words come true, including the death of Dzidek Krępak, a brown-haired man. Despite various adversities, Michał manages to identify the real murderer.

Cast and characters
 Krzysztof Kowalewski as Michał Roman
 Wojciech Pokora as Kowalski, Michał's neighbour
 Janina Traczykówna as Lucyna Barańczak, Michał's neighbour
 Wiesław Gołas as Kazik Malinowski, Michał's friend
 Bohdan Łazuka as Michał's neighbour
 Ryszard Pietruski as Dzidek Krępak
 Bożena Dykiel as Anna Roman, Michał's wife

References

External links
 
 

1976 films
1970s Polish-language films
Films directed by Stanisław Bareja
1976 comedy films
Polish comedy films